Weyrauch is a German surname. The name is sometimes spelled Weirauch. Notable people with the surname include:

Erwin Antonín Weyrauch (1803–1865), Bohemian writer and priest of Premonstratensian Order 
Jakob Johann von Weyrauch (1845–1917), German mathematician and engineer
Johannes Weyrauch (1897–1977), German composer
Wolfgang Weyrauch (1904–1980), German writer
Wolfgang Karl Weyrauch (1907–1970), German-Peruvian zoologist

German-language surnames